Huizenga is a surname of Dutch origin. Notable people with the surname include:
 Jenning Huizenga (born 1984), Dutch professional racing-cyclist
 John R. Huizenga (1921–2014), American nuclear physical chemist
 Kevin Huizenga (born 1977), American cartoonist
 Mark Huizenga, American politician
 Robert Huizenga, American physician
 Wayne Huizenga (1937–2018), American businessman
 William Patrick "Bill" Huizenga (born 1969), American politician

See also
 Huizinga (name)
 H. Wayne Huizenga School of Business and Entrepreneurship

References

Dutch-language surnames